The Cathedral Basilica of St. Dionysius the Areopagite is the main Roman Catholic church of Athens, Greece, and the seat of the Roman Catholic Archbishop of Athens. It is located in central Athens, at the junction of Panepistimiou Avenue with Omirou Street and is dedicated to Saint Dionysius the Areopagite, disciple of the Apostle Saint Paul and the first bishop of Athens.

History and construction

The church is a three-aisle basilica in the neo-Renaissance style. The German architect Leo von Klenze drafted the plans for the cathedral at the behest of King Otto of Greece. The architecture is influenced by St Boniface's Abbey in Munich. During the project, the plans were modified by the Greek architect Lysandros Kaftanzoglou, who offered to direct the work of the church, until completion, without any remuneration. The land for the construction of the church was purchased in 1847 with money collected among the Roman Catholics of Greece, while the building was built by fundraisers among Catholics both inside and outside the country. The nave was built in 1853 and the inauguration took place on 4 August 1865.

The church is 38 metres long, 15 metres high and 24 metres wide. The church's interior is decorated with beautiful frescoes. Of the most beautiful is the fresco of semi-domes of triumphal arch, representing the Apotheosis of Saint Dionysius the Areopagite (1890) and is the work of Italian painter from Rimini Guglielmo Bilancioni (1836-1907). The pillars, which support the triumphal arch, represent in life-size the four Evangelists. In front of the triumphal arch is depicted Christ Pantocrator with the Gospel in hand. In the adjacent corner on the right is Moses holding a parchment, and on the left the Prophet David playing a harp. Below are Saint Gregory the Great and Saint Augustine. The church floor is paved with Pentelic marble. The nave is supported by 12 columns of 5 metres of green marble from Tinos. The platform of dance above the main entrance of the temple, which is also the Pipe organ, was built in 1888 by architect Paul Sambi (Paul Chambaut). Right and left of the main entrance are two inscriptions, one in Latin, the other in modern Greek, commemorating the Athenian visit of pope John Paul II in 2001. Finally, right and left of the sanctuary are two marble pulpits, donated by Franz Joseph I of Austria when he visited Athens in 1869.

In 1962, the Catholic marriage of Princess Sophia of Greece and Denmark and Infante Juan Carlos of Spain took place in the church, which preceded the Orthodox wedding rites.

The stained glass windows of the church

The eight stained glass windows on both sides of the lower part of the church were painted by the director of the royal workshops of Munich Carl de Boucher (Karl de Bouchet) and donated by King Ludwig of Bavaria.

The four windows of the right aisle of the church adorn respectively stained glass of Saint Amalia, Pope Sixtus II, Pope Telesphorus, Saint Athanasius of Alexandria, and the stained glass windows of the left aisle depicting the Saint Otto, the Pope Anterus, Pope Anacletus and the Saint John Chrysostom, the Patriarch of Constantinople.

Sources
 Eugene Dalezios: "The Athens Cathedral of St. Dionysius the Areopagite," Athens, 1965.
 Official five-language pamphlet Cathedral St. Dionysius the Areopagite, Athens.

External links

 Catholic Cathedral Basilica of St. Dionysius the Areopagite
 Καθολικός Ναός Αγίου Διονυσίου
 Aghios Dionyssios Catholic Church
 Catholic Cathedral of St. Dionysius in Athens

Dionysius the Areopagite
Renaissance Revival architecture in Greece
Cathedrals in Athens
Roman Catholic churches completed in 1865
19th-century Roman Catholic church buildings